Oleksiy Tamrazov (born 23 January 1975) is a Ukrainian rally driver.

WRC results

* Season still in progress.

Complete IRC results 

* Season still in progress.

External links 
ewrc-results.com profile

1974 births
Living people
World Rally Championship drivers
Intercontinental Rally Challenge drivers
Ukrainian rally drivers